The Miss Spain 2011 pageant was held on November 27, 2011. There were 51 candidates for the national title. The winner will represent Spain at Miss Universe 2012. The First Runner Up would enter Miss World 2012. The Second Runner Up would enter Miss International 2012. The finalist would go to small pageants. Eventually, Andrea Huisgen was umplace at Miss Universe 2012, Aránzazu Estévez Godoy classified as one of the Top 15 Finalist at Miss World 2012 and Ana Crespo was unplace at  Miss International 2012.

The Andrea Huisgen Barcelona has been chosen Miss Spain 2011 in a gala held in Seville, where he received the crown from 2010 winner, the Teruel Paula Guillo. Huisgen, 20, 1.80 meters tall, green-eyed blonde has been selected from among the 52 candidates who participated.

Results

Special awards
Miss Elagance - Aranzazu Estevez
Miss Congeniality (voted by the contestants) - Clara Maria Toribio

Delegates

External links
http://www.laguiatv.com/especiales/miss-mister-espana/miss-2011

Miss Spain
2011 in Spain
2011 beauty pageants
2010s in Andalusia